The Crucifix is a 1934 British drama film directed by G.B. Samuelson and starring Sydney Fairbrother, Nancy Price and Farren Soutar. It was produced as a quota quickie for release by Universal Pictures.

Plot 
An elderly woman hires a young aide to care for her and terrorizes her with her unreasonable demands.

Cast
Sydney Fairbrother as Lavinia Brooker
Nancy Price as Miss Bryany
Farren Soutar as Lord Louis
Brenda Harvey as Miss Bryany (1886)
Audrey Cameron as Lavinia (1886)
Pollie Emery as Landlady

References

Bibliography
 Chibnall, Steve. Quota Quickies: The Birth of the British 'B' Film. British Film Institute, 2007.
 Low, Rachael. Filmmaking in 1930s Britain. George Allen & Unwin, 1985.
 Wood, Linda. British Films, 1927-1939. British Film Institute, 1986.

External links
 
 
 The Crucifix at BFI Film & TV Database

1934 films
1930s English-language films
Paramount Pictures films
British black-and-white films
British drama films
1934 drama films
1930s British films
Universal Pictures films
Quota quickies